Shelomets is a rural locality (a village) in Yenangskoye Rural Settlement, Kichmengsko-Gorodetsky District, Vologda Oblast, Russia. The population was 11 as of 2002.

Geography 
Shelomets is located 43 km southeast of Kichmengsky Gorodok (the district's administrative centre) by road. Bolshoye Sirino is the nearest rural locality.

References 

Rural localities in Kichmengsko-Gorodetsky District